Jamie Lloyd Whitten (April 18, 1910September 9, 1995) was an American politician and member of the Democratic Party who represented the state of Mississippi in the United States House of Representatives from 1941 to 1995. He was at the time of his departure the longest-serving U.S. Representative ever. From 1979 to 1995, he was Dean of the U.S. House of Representatives. He is the longest-serving member of Congress ever from Mississippi. He was a New Deal liberal in economic matters, and took a leading role in Congress in forming national policy and spending regarding agriculture.

Early life, education, and early career
Jamie Whitten was born in Cascilla, Mississippi. He attended local public schools and the University of Mississippi where he was a member of Beta Theta Pi fraternity. He worked as a school teacher and principal and was elected as a Democrat to the Mississippi House of Representatives, where he served in 1931 and 1932.  He attained admission to the bar in 1932, and from 1933 to 1941 he was District Attorney of Mississippi's 17th District, which included his home county of Tallahatchie.

U.S. House of Representatives

Elections

In 1941, Whitten was elected as a Democrat to the United States House of Representatives in a special election to represent the state's 2nd District, in the northern part of the state.  The seat had come open as a result of incumbent Congressman Wall Doxey's election to the United States Senate.  He was elected to a full term in 1942 and was re-elected 25 more times.

Whitten's district was renumbered as the 1st District after the 1970 Census.

Tenure as leader in agricultural policy
Whitten had the support of the Democratic caucus and served as chair of the Appropriations subcommittee on agriculture (1949-1953 and 1954-1978). He was chair of the entire committee 1979-1992. Throughout that period he had a decisive voice on agricultural spending and to a large extent on policies.

In 1977 his subcommittee lost control of environmental issues. He lost his influence after suffering a debilitating stroke in February 1992.  As a champion for American farmers, he fought against the FDA's early 1970s recommendation of restricting the use of antibiotics in livestock. He required that scientists prove the danger of antibiotic use.

Whitten was a New Dealer who supported most liberal spending issues. He supported distribution of free food to the poor from surplus commodity stocks, school lunch programs and food stamps in coalition with urban Democrats.  In the 1980s he clashed with the conservative Reagan administration on policy matters. He voted against Reagan's economic plans, tax cuts, increased defense spending, balanced budget initiative, tort reform, welfare reform, abortion restrictions, missile defense system, and the Persian Gulf War. Although Whitten represented a district that grew increasingly suburban and Republican from the 1970s onward, his opposition to Reagan's program did not affect him at the ballot box. Indeed, his seniority and popularity resulted in his facing only "sacrificial lamb" opponents on the occasions he faced any opposition at all, even in years when Republican presidential candidates carried the district in landslides. Nonetheless, it was taken for granted that he would be succeeded by a Republican when he retired.

Whitten was originally a segregationist, as were many of his colleagues from Mississippi and the rest of the South. He signed the Southern Manifesto condemning the U.S. Supreme Court decision Brown vs. Board of Education, which desegregated public schools. Along with virtually the entire Mississippi congressional delegation, he voted against the Civil Rights Acts of 1957, 1960, 1964, 1965 and 1968. Whitten later apologized for these votes, calling them a "mistake" caused by severe misjudgment. He voted for the Civil Rights Act of 1991.

Declining to run for reelection to a historic 28th term in 1994, Whitten retired from the House as America's longest-serving Congressman (53 years and two months). He retired to his home in Oxford, Mississippi and died there on September 9, 1995, aged 85, eight months. His service from November 4, 1941, to January 3, 1995 set a record for length of service in the House, which remained unbroken until February 11, 2009, when Michigan Congressman John Dingell surpassed it. Whitten is also the 5th longest-serving Congressman (House and/or Senate) behind Daniel Inouye, Carl T. Hayden, Robert Byrd and John Dingell.

Throughout most of his tenure in the House, Whitten served on the Appropriations Committee, ultimately serving as Chairman from the 1979 retirement of George H. Mahon until newly-elected Democrats in the House Democratic Caucus removed him in favor of William Huston Natcher after the 1992 election.  In 1985, when then-junior Appropriations Committee member Dick Durbin spoke with Chairman Whitten about possibly sitting on the Budget Committee, Whitten told him, "Well, if you want to be on that committee, you can be on that committee, but I want you to remember one thing, the Budget Committee deals in hallucinations and the Appropriations Committee deals in facts."  While on the floor of the Senate on March 21, 2018, now Senator Durbin referred to that quote from Whitten as "Whitten's Law," which implies that the Budget Committee is a political branch that makes budget promises while the Appropriations Committee is obliged to either make or break those promises during the budget-making process.

Publications
Whitten authored That We May Live, written largely as a pro-development, pro-chemical pesticide answer to Rachel Carson's Silent Spring, the seminal 1962 book that helped spur the modern environmental movement.

Legacy and honors
The Jamie Whitten Historical Site is located at the bridge of the Natchez Trace Parkway over the Tennessee-Tombigbee Waterway, two projects that Whitten had successfully fought to fund over his house tenure, overcoming strong opposition from conservatives to their construction using federal funds.

In June 1995, Congress renamed the main headquarters building of the United States Department of Agriculture in Washington, DC the Jamie L. Whitten Building in his honor.

The Beta Beta chapter of Beta Theta Pi fraternity at the University of Mississippi has named their leadership award after brother Whitten. Each year, one graduating brother is selected to receive the award based on his leadership and commitment to the chapter, university, and community.

References

External links

|-

|-

|-

1910 births
1995 deaths
20th-century American lawyers
20th-century American politicians
Deans of the United States House of Representatives
Democratic Party members of the United States House of Representatives from Mississippi
District attorneys in Mississippi
Democratic Party members of the Mississippi House of Representatives
Mississippi lawyers
People from Oxford, Mississippi
People from Tallahatchie County, Mississippi